Pierre Quillard (born Paris, 14 July 1864 - died Neuilly-sur-Seine, 4 February 1912) was a French symbolist poet, playwright, translator (from Greek), and journalist.    In his youth, Quillard was a pupil of the Lycée Fontanes, where he counted Éphraïm Mickaël, Stuart Merrill, René Ghil, André Fontainas, Rodolphe Darzens and Georges Vanor among his classmates. An anarchist and supporter of Dreyfus, he later became one of the first people to defend the Armenians persecuted under the Ottoman Empire.

References
Jean Maitron (dir.), Dictionnaire biographique du mouvement ouvrier français. Troisième partie, 1871-1914, de la Commune à la Grande Guerre, t. XIV, Éditions ouvrières, Paris, 1976
Edmond Khayadjian, Archag Tchobanian et le mouvement arménophile en France, CNDP, Marseille, 1986. 2e édition : Sigest, Alfortville, 2001.

External links
 
 

1864 births
1912 deaths
French poets
19th-century French dramatists and playwrights
French journalists
French anarchists
Translators from Greek
Translators to French
Symbolist dramatists and playwrights
Symbolist writers
Writers from Paris
French male poets
19th-century French translators
19th-century French male writers
French male non-fiction writers
École Nationale des Chartes alumni